Thomas Clas-Göran Carlsson (born 1962) is a Swedish politician and former member of the Riksdag, the national legislature. A member of the Social Democratic Party, he represented Kronoberg County between October 2010 and September 2014. He was also a substitute member of the Riksdag for Tomas Eneroth between July 2017 and September 2022.

Carlsson is the son of welder Göran Carlsson and clerk Elsie-Britt Carlsson (née Linder). He was educated in Ljungby. He studied business administration at Halmstad University and economics at Växjö University. He was a substitute teacher (1982-1983), a bank clerk (1983-1987), bank manager (1987-1992) and managing director of Bertil Nilsson Måleri AB (1992-2002). He was a member of the municipal council in Ljungby Municipality from 2002 to 2010.

References

1962 births
Living people
Members of the Riksdag 2010–2014
Members of the Riksdag from the Social Democrats